The Bombardier CRJ family includes:
 Bombardier CRJ100/200
 Bombardier CRJ700 series, extended to the CRJ900, and CRJ1000